Gymnobathra sarcoxantha is a moth in the family Oecophoridae first described by  Edward Meyrick in 1883. It is endemic to New Zealand. It has been hypothesised that this species likely belongs to another genus.

References

Moths described in 1883
Oecophoridae
Taxa named by Edward Meyrick
Moths of New Zealand
Endemic fauna of New Zealand
Endemic moths of New Zealand